Vicia pisiformis is a species of flowering plant belonging to the family Fabaceae.

Its native range is Europe to Western Siberia, and Caucasus.

References

pisiformis